Lucien Moraud,  (May 16, 1885 – May 29, 1951) was a Canadian lawyer, law professor and Conservative politician. He was named to the Senate of Canada on December 30, 1933, and remained a senator until his death in 1951.

He was one of the Canadian delegates at the foundation of the United Nations.

Pavillon H.-Biermans-L.-Moraud, a residence hall at Université Laval, is named after him and Belgian businessperson Jean-Hubert Biermans in honour of their donations to the university.

References 

Barreau du Québec : Les Bâtonniers de 1930-1939
Université Laval : Pavillon H.-Biermans-L.-Moraud

1885 births
1951 deaths
Lawyers in Quebec
Canadian senators from Quebec
Conservative Party of Canada (1867–1942) senators
Philanthropists from Quebec
Progressive Conservative Party of Canada senators
20th-century philanthropists